Drunken Robot Pornography is a 2014 first-person shooter game developed and published by Dejobaan Games.

Gameplay
Drunken Robot Pornography is a first-person shooter game.

Plot

In the future, in Boston Massachusetts, wearing a robot suit, you are a gladiator who fights in the arena to acquire badges and some email messages.

Development and release
Drunken Robot Pornography was developed and published by the American indie developer Dejobaan Games. Dejobaan Games previously developed The Wonderful End of the World (2008) and AaaaaAAaaaAAAaaAAAAaAAAAA!!! — A Reckless Disregard for Gravity (2009).

The game was first announced on 1 April 2010 as an April fool's Joke.
It was released worldwide on 19 February 2014.

Reception

Drunken Robot Pornography received mixed or average reviews according to review aggregator Metacritic, based on 6 reviews.

References 

2014 video games
First-person shooters
Linux games
Single-player video games
Windows games
Video games developed in the United States
Dejobaan Games games